This is a list of notable Germans. Persons of mixed heritage have their respective ancestries credited.

Architects 

 Walter Gropius (1883–1969), architect
 Carl Ludvig Engel (1778–1840), architect
 Leo von Klenze (1784–1864), architect
 Balthasar Neumann (1687–1753), architect and engineer
 Matthäus Daniel Pöppelmann (1662–1736), architect
 Ludwig Mies van der Rohe (1886–1969), architect
 Karl Friedrich Schinkel (1781–1841), architect and painter
 Johann Conrad Schlaun (1695–1773), architect
 Gottfried Semper (1803–1879), architect
 Albert Speer (1905–1981), architect
 Wilhelm Kreis (1873–1955), architect

Artists

A–M 

 Hans von Aachen (1552–1615), mannerist painter
 Albrecht Altdorfer (1480–1538), painter
 Gertrud Arndt (1903–2000), photographer; pioneering self-portraiture
 Ernst Barlach (1870–1938), sculptor and writer
 Günther Behnisch (1922–2010), architect
 Peter Behrens (1868–1940), architect
 Sibylle Bergemann (1941–2010), photographer
 Joseph Beuys (1921–1986), artist
 Hermann Biow (1804–1850), photographer
 Elisabeth Böhm (1921–2012), architect
 Gottfried Böhm (1920–2021), architect
 Arno Breker (1900–1991), sculptor
 Lovis Corinth (1858–1925), painter
 Lucas Cranach the Elder (1472–1553), painter
 Lucas Cranach the Younger (1515–1586), painter
 Yitzhak Danziger (1916–1977), Berlin-born Israeli sculptor
 Otto Dix (1891–1969), painter
 Leon Draisaitl (born 1995), ice hockey player of the Edmonton Oilers
 Albrecht Dürer (1471–1528), painter
 Egon Eiermann (1904–1970), architect and designer
 Max Ernst (1891–1976), surrealist painter
 Carl Eytel (1862–1925), painter of desert landscapes in the American Southwest
 Caspar David Friedrich (1774–1840), painter
 Dörte Gatermann (born 1956), architect
 Willi Glasauer (born 1938), artist
 Walter Gropius (1883–1969), architect
 George Grosz (1893–1959), artist
 Matthias Grünewald (c. 1470 – 1528), German Renaissance painter
 Johann Gottlieb Hantzsch (1794–1848), painter (genre works)
 Bettina Heinen-Ayech (1937–2020), painter
 Hannah Höch (1889–1978), artist
 Hans Holbein the Elder (c. 1465 – 1524), painter
 Hans Holbein the Younger (c. 1497 – 1543), illustrator and painter
 Jörg Immendorff, painter
 Helmut Jahn (1940–2021), architect and designer
 Horst Janssen (1929–1995), draftsman, graphic artist, woodcutter, watercolour painter, writer
 Ulli Kampelmann (born 1952), sculptor and painter
 Anselm Kiefer (born 1945), painter
 Martin Kippenberger (1953–1997), painter
 Ernst Ludwig Kirchner (1880–1938), painter
 Leo von Klenze (1784–1864), architect
 Hans Kollhoff (born 1946), architect
 Käthe Kollwitz (1867–1945), painter
 Christian Lemmerz (born 1959), sculptor and scenographer
 Max Liebermann, painter
 Markus Lüpertz (born 1941), painter and sculptor
 August Macke (1887–1914), painter
 Harro Magnussen (1861–1908), sculptor
 Franz Marc (1880–1916), painter
 Hans Memling (c. 1430 – 1494), painter
 Ludwig Mies van der Rohe (1886–1969), architect and designer
 Paula Modersohn-Becker (1876–1907), painter
 Georg Muche (1895–1987), painter, printmaker, architect, author and teacher

N–Z 

 Helmut Newton (1920–2004), photographer
 Frei Otto (1925–2015), architect and research scientist
 Max Pechstein (1881–1955), painter
 Sigmar Polke (1941–2010), painter
 Gerhard Richter (born 1932), painter
 Julius Runge (1843–1922), marine painter
 Karl Friedrich Schinkel, architect and painter
 Oskar Schlemmer (1888–1943), choreographer, painter, sculptor and stage designer
 Eberhard Schlotter (1921–2014), painter
 Karl Schmidt-Rottluff (1884–1976), painter
 Kurt Schwitters, painter and poet
 Fritz Schumacher (1869–1947), architect and urban designer
 Max Slevogt, painter
 Carl Spitzweg (1808–1885), painter
 Birgit Stauch (born 1961), sculptor
 Fritz Stoltenberg (1855–1921), landscape artist and marine painter
 Franz Stuck, painter
 Yigal Tumarkin (1933–2021), Israeli painter and sculptor
 Wolf Vostell (1932–1998), artist
 Bertha Wehnert-Beckmann (1815–1901), pioneering female photographer
 Emilie Winkelmann (1875–1951), architect

Company founders

A–M

 Karl Albrecht (1920–2014) and Theo Albrecht (1922–2010), founder of Aldi
 Ludwig Bamberger (1823–1899), co-founder of Deutsche Bank
 John Jacob Bausch (1830–1926), co-founder of Bausch & Lomb, makers of contact lenses and Ray-Ban sunglasses
 Friedrich Bayer (1825–1880), founder of what would become Bayer, chemical and pharmaceutical company
 Hans Beck (1929–2009), founder of Playmobil
 Paul Beiersdorf (1836–1896), founded Beiersdorf AG, manufacturers of Nivea, Eucerin
 Melitta Bentz (1873–1950), invented the coffee filter and started Melitta, manufacturers of coffee, paper coffee filters and coffee makers
 Karl Benz (1844–1929), inventor of the gasoline-powered automobile; co-founder of the automobile manufacturer Mercedes-Benz
 Maximilian Delphinius Berlitz (1852–1921), founder of Berlitz Language Schools
 Carl Bertelsmann (1791–1850), founder of Bertelsmann AG, subsidiaries include Random House and BMG
 Johann Adam Birkenstock, in 1774 founded Birkenstock shoe company
 Hermann Blohm (1848–1930), in 1877, co-founder of Blohm+Voss, manufacturer of ships
 Carl F. W. Borgward (1890–1963), founder of Borgward
 August Borsig (1804–1854), founder of Borsig Werke
 Robert Bosch (1861–1942), industrialist, engineer and inventor; founder of Robert Bosch GmbH
 Hugo Boss (1885–1948), fashion designer, founder of Hugo Boss AG
 Max Braun (1883–1967), founder of Braun GmbH, makers of personal care appliances, coffee makers and other home appliances
 Adolphus Busch (1839–1913), co-founder of Anheuser-Busch brewing company
 Adolph Coors (1847–1929), founder of the Adolph Coors Company brewery, now part of MillerCoors
 Gottlieb Daimler (1834–1900), inventor and engineer; founder of Daimler Motoren Gesellschaft, now Daimler-Benz AG
 Adolf Dassler (1900–1978), founder of sportswear company Adidas
 Rudolf Dassler (1898–1974), founder of sportwear company Puma
 Adelbert Delbrück (1822–1899), co-founder of Deutsche Bank
 Guido Henckel von Donnersmarck (1830–1916), founder of company Schlesische AG für Bergbau und Zinkhüttenbetrieb
 Claude Dornier (1884–1969), founder of Dornier Flugzeugwerke
 Friedrich Engelhorn (1821–1902), founder of the chemical company BASF
 Kaspar Faber (1730–1784), founder of Faber-Castell, manufacturers of office supplies, art supplies, writing instruments and leather goods
 Günther Fielmann (born 1939), founder of Fielmann
 Wilhelm von Finck (1848–1924), co-founder of Munich Re and Allianz
 Eduard Fresenius (1874–1946), founder of Fresenius
 Jakob Fugger the Elder (1368–1469), founder of Fugger bank
 Marcus Goldman (1821–1904), co-founder of Goldman Sachs
 Max Grundig (1908–1989), founder of Grundig
 Max Herz (1905–1965), co-founder of Tchibo
 Ernst Heinkel (1888–1958), founder of Heinkel, manufacturer of airplanes
 Richard Hellmann (1876–1971), founder of Hellmann's Mayonnaise
 Friedrich Karl Henkel (1848–1930), founder of Henkel
 J.A. Henckels, manufacturers of kitchen knives, scissors, cookware and flatware
 August Horch (1868–1951), founder of Audi automobile company in 1909
 Helmut Horten (1909–1987), founder of Horten AG
 August Howaldt (1809–1883), founder of Howaldtswerke-Deutsche Werft in 1835
 Hugo Junkers (1859–1935), founder of Junkers, manufacturer of airplanes in 1895
 Rudolph Karstadt (1856–1944), founder of Karstadt
 Ernst Keil (1816–1878), founder and publisher of Die Gartenlaube
 Carl Kellner, founder of Ernst Leitz GmbH, which later became Leica Camera AG, Leica Geosystems AG, and Leica Microsystems AG, producing cameras, geosurvey equipment and microscopes
 Carl Heinrich Theodor Knorr (1800–1875) founder of Knorr
 Friedrich Krupp (1787–1826), steel manufacturer and founder of the steel producers ThyssenKrupp AG
 Heinrich Lanz (1838–1905), founder of Heinrich Lanz AG
 Henry Lehman (1822–1855), Emanuel Lehman (1827–1907) and Mayer Lehman (1830–1897), German-born bankers, co-founders of Lehman Brothers
 Carl von Linde (1842–1934), founder of The Linde Group
 Henry Lomb (1828–1908), co-founder of Bausch & Lomb
 Friedrich Lürssen (1851–1916), founder of Lürssen in 1875, manufacturers of ships
 Oscar Ferdinand Mayer (1859–1955), founder of the processed-meat firm Oscar Mayer
 Joseph Mendelssohn (1770–1848), founder of former bank Mendelssohn & Co.
 Friedrich Jacob Merck (1621–1678), founder of Merck KGaA (Engel-Apotheke in Darmstadt)
 George Merck (1867–1926), founder of Merck & Co.
 Willy Messerschmitt (1875–1978), founder of Messerschmitt, airplane manufacturer
 Heinrich Meyerfreund, founder of Garoto, chocolate company in Brazil
 Carl Miele (1869–1938), founder of Miele, manufacturer of domestic appliances
 Frederick Miller (born as Friedrich Eduard Johannes Müller) (1824–1888), founder of the Miller Brewing Company in 1855

N–Z

 Josef Neckermann (1912–1992), founder of the company Neckermann
 August Oetker (1862–1918), founder of the company Dr Oetker
 Adam Opel (1837–1895), founder of the automobile company Adam Opel AG
 Salomon Oppenheim (1772–1828), founder of bank Sal. Oppenheim
 Ernest Oppenheimer (1880–1957), diamond and gold mining entrepreneur, financier and philanthropist, who controlled De Beers and founded the Anglo American Corporation of South Africa
 Werner Otto (1909–2011), founder of Otto GmbH, now Otto Group, a mail order company
 Ferdinand Porsche (1875–1951), designer and founder of Porsche
 Günther Quandt (1881–1954), industrial, entrepreneur of different companies (today includes BMW AG and Altana)
 Karl Friedrich Rapp (1882–1962), co-founder of Rapp Motorenwerke GmbH, which later became BMW AG
 Emil Rathenau (1838–1915), founder of AEG
 Paul Reuter (1816–1899), pioneer of telegraphy and news reporting; founder of Reuters news agency
 Hans Riegel, Sr. (1893–1945), founder of Haribo, manufacturer of gummy and jelly sweets
 Nathan Mayer Rothschild (1777–1836), founder of British company N M Rothschild & Sons
 Ernst Christian Friedrich Schering (1824–1889), founder of the pharmaceutical company Schering AG
 Gustav Schickedanz (1895–1977), founder of Quelle
 Anton Schlecker (born 1944), founder of Schlecker
 Ernst Schmidt and Wilhelm Schmidt-Ruthenbeck (1906–1988), founders of Metro AG
 Fritz Sennheiser (1912–2010), founder of Sennheiser Electronic GmbH & Co. KG, specializing in high fidelity products
 Georg von Siemens (1839–1901), co-founder of Deutsche Bank
 Werner von Siemens (1816–1892), inventor, founder of Siemens, electronics and electrical engineering company
 J.S. Staedtler, in 1835 founded Staedtler Mars GmbH & Co. KG, suppliers of writing, artist, and engineering drawing instruments
 Bruno Steinhoff (born 1937), founder of Steinhoff
 Henry E. Steinway (1797–1871), founder of the piano company Steinway & Sons
 Hugo Stinnes (1870–1924), co-founder of Rheinisch-Westfälisches Elektrizitätswerk AG
 August Storck-Oberwelland, in 1903 founder of Werther's Sugar Confectionery Factory, now August Storck AG
 Franz Ströher (born c. 1854–1936), in 1880 founded cosmetics company Wella AG
 Carl Tchilinghiryan (1910–1987), co-founder of Tchibo
 Carl von Thieme (1844–1924), founder of Allianz AG, financial services company
 August Thyssen (1842–1926), founder of Walzwerk Thyssen & Co. in Mülheim an der Ruhr
 Friedrich Thyssen (1804–1877), founder of Draht-Fabrik-Compagnie in Aachen
 Hermann Tietz (1837–1907), founder of Hertie, department store
 Leopold Ullstein (1826–1899), founder of publishing company Ullstein Verlag
 Ernst Voss (1842–1920), in 1877, co-founder of Blohm+Voss, manufacturer of ships
 Carl Walther (1858–1915), founder of Walther
 Moses Marcus Warburg (1763–1820) and Gershon Warburg (1765–1826), co-founder of M. M. Warburg & Co., German bank
 Siegmund Warburg, founder of S. G. Warburg & Co., British bank
 Bartholomeus V. Welser (1484–1561), Welser brothers bank
 Georg Wertheim (1857–1939), founder of Wertheim, department store
 Stef Wertheimer (born 1926), German-born Israeli industrialist, investor, philanthropist, billionaire, and former Member of the Knesset
 Aloys Wobben (1952–2021), founder of Enercon
 Reinhold Würth (born 1935), company Würth
 Carl Zeiss (1816–1888), founder of Carl Zeiss AG, maker of optical instruments
 Ferdinand von Zeppelin (1838–1917), inventor of the Zeppelin; founder of the Zeppelin Airship company

Fashion models
 
 Johanna Acs (born 1992), model
 Nadja Auermann (born 1971), supermodel
 Eugen Bauder (born 1986)
 Charlott Cordes (born 1988)
 Zohre Esmaeli (born 1985 in Afghanistan), model, author, designer
 Toni Garrn (born 1992) 
 Stefanie Giesinger (born 1996), model
 Lena Gercke (born 1988), winner of 2006 Germany's Next Topmodel
 Jennifer Hof (born 1991), winner of 2008 Germany's Next Topmodel
 Alexandra Kamp (born 1966)
 Heidi Klum (born 1973), model and host of Project Runway and Germany's Next Topmodel
 Diane Kruger (born 1976), model and actress
 Barbara Meier (born 1986), winner of 2007 Germany's Next Topmodel
 Uschi Obermaier (born 1946), model and actress
 Eva Padberg (born 1980)
 Nico (1938–1988), model, singer and actress
 Tatjana Patitz (born 1966), supermodel
 Claudia Schiffer (born 1970), supermodel
 Julia Stegner (born 1984)

Fashionmakers 

 Hugo Boss (1885–1948), fashion designer
 Wolfgang Joop (born 1944), fashion designer
 Karl Lagerfeld (1933–2019), fashion designer
 Michael Michalsky (born 1967), fashion designer

Film and theatre

Actresses and actors

A–M

 Inga Abel (1946–2000), actress
 Mario Adorf (born 1930), actor and writer
 Hans Albers (1891–1960), actor
 Iris Berben (born 1950), actress
 Moritz Bleibtreu (born 1971), actor
 Grit Boettcher (born 1938), actress
 Eric Braeden (born Hans Gudegast, 1941), actor
 Daniel Brühl (born 1978), actor
 Horst Buchholz (1933–2003), actor
 Vicco von Bülow (also known as Loriot), actor and comedian 
 Zazie Beetz (born 1991), German born American actress
 Hans Clarin (1930–2005), actor
 August Diehl (born 1976), actor
 Marlene Dietrich (1901–1992), actress
 George Dzundza (born 1945), actor
 Heinz Erhardt (1909–1979), actor and comedian
 Veronica Ferres (born 1965), actress
 Gert Fröbe (1913–1988), actor
 Cornelia Froboess (born 1943), actress
 Martina Gedeck (born 1961), actress
 Götz George (1938–2016), actor
 Heinrich George (1893–1946), actor
 Gustaf Gründgens (1899–1963), actor
 Eva Habermann (born 1976), actress and model
 Evelyn Hamann (1942–2007), actress
 Brigitte Helm (1908–1996), actress
 Henriette Hendel-Schütz (1772–1849), stage actress, mimoplastic performer
 Michael Herbig (born 1968), actor, director and comedian
 Emil Jannings (1884–1950), actor
 Harald Juhnke (1929–2005), actor and comedian
 Heidi Kabel (1914–2010), actress
 Klaus Kinski (1926–1991), actor; Polish-German father, German mother
 Nastassja Kinski (born 1959), actress; daughter of actor Klaus Kinski
 Heidi Klum (born 1973), model and actress
 Hildegard Knef (1925–2002), actress, singer and writer
 Sebastian Koch (born 1962), actor
 Thomas Kretschmann (born 1962), actor and model
 Diane Kruger (born 1976), actress and model
 Alexandra Maria Lara (born 1978), actress
 Siegfried Lowitz (1914–1999),actor
 Heike Makatsch (born 1971), actress
 Hanna Maron (1923–2014), Israeli actress
 Inge Meysel (1910–2004), actress
 Brigitte Mira (1910–2005), actress
 Willy Millowitsch (1909–1999), actor
 Ulrich Mühe (1953–2007), actor
 Armin Mueller-Stahl (born 1930), actor

N–Z

 Luise Neumann (1818–1905)
 Uwe Ochsenknecht (born 1956), actor
 Christian Oliver, actor
 Lilli Palmer (1914–1986), actress
 Franka Potente (born 1974), actress
 Jürgen Prochnow (born 1941), actor
 Luise Rainer (1910–2014), actress
 Heinz Rühmann (1902–1994), actor
 Otto Sander (1941–2013), actor
 Claudia Schiffer (born 1970), actress and supermodel
 Romy Schneider (1938–1982), actress
 Jessica Schwarz (born 1977), actress
 Til Schweiger (born 1963), actor
 Matthias Schweighöfer (born 1981), actor
 Hanna Schygulla (born 1943), actress
 Xenia Seeberg (born 1972), actress and model
 Tomer Sisley (born 1974), Israeli humorist, actor, screenwriter, comedian, and film director
 Kristina Söderbaum (1912–2001), actress and photographer
 Günter Strack (1929–1999), actor
 Barbara Sukowa (born 1950), actress
 Horst Tappert (1923–2008), actor
 Katharina Thalbach (born 1954), actress
 Nora Tschirner (born 1981), actress
 Ulrich Tukur (born 1957), actor
 Nadja Uhl (born 1972), actress
 Wolfgang Völz (1930–2018), actor
 Fritz Wepper (born 1941), actor
 Luise del Zopp (1871–1946), actress, opera singer, screenwriter

Filmmakers

 Uwe Boll, film director
 Andreas Deja, animator
 Doris Dörrie, female film director
 Bernd Eichinger (1949–2011), film producer
 Roland Emmerich (born 1955), film director (Stargate, Independence Day, Godzilla, The Day After Tomorrow)
 Harun Farocki (1944–2014), film director
 Rainer Werner Fassbinder (1945–1982), film director
 Florian Henckel von Donnersmarck, film director; Academy Award winner
 Werner Herzog (born 1942), film director
 Oliver Hirschbiegel, film director
 Alexander Kluge (born 1932), film director
 Carl Koch (1892–1963), film director and writer
 Fritz Lang (1890–1976), film director
 Ernst Lubitsch (1892–1947), film director
 F.W. Murnau (1888–1931), film director
 Wolfgang Petersen (1941–2022), film director
 Ashwin Raman (born 1946), documentary filmmaker
 Leni Riefenstahl (1902–2003), female film director
 Helma Sanders-Brahms (1940–2014), film director
 Peter Schamoni (1934–2011), film director
 Volker Schlöndorff (born 1939), film director
 Andreas Schnaas (born 1968), film director
 Hans-Jürgen Syberberg (born 1935), film director
 Tom Tykwer (born 1965), film director
 Margarethe von Trotta (born 1942), film director
 Robert Wiene, film director
 Wim Wenders (born 1945), film director

Literature

Classic

 Adam of Bremen (c. 1050 – c. 1085), medieval chronicler
 Joseph von Auffenberg (1798–1857), dramatist
 Heinrich Böll (1917–1985), author
 Bertolt Brecht (1898–1956), playwright and poet
 Clemens Brentano (1778–1842), poet and novelist
 Georg Büchner, dramatist and author
 Charles Bukowski (1920–1994), German-born American poet, novelist, and short story writer
 Wilhelm Busch (1832–1908), poet and satirist
 Annette von Droste-Hülshoff (1797–1848), poet
 Joseph von Eichendorff (1788–1857), poet
 Theodor Fontane (1819–1898), novelist and poet
 Johann Wolfgang von Goethe (1749–1832), author and poet
 Brothers Grimm, collectors of fairy tales
 Heinrich Heine (1797–1856), poet
 Johann Gottfried Herder (1744–1803), essayist and poet
 Hermann Hesse (1877–1962), author
 E.T.A. Hoffmann (1776–1822), author
 Friedrich Hölderlin (1770–1843), poet
 Ernst Jünger (1895–1998), writer and novelist
 Erich Kästner (1899–1974), novelist
 Heinrich von Kleist (1777–1811), poet, dramatist and novelist
 Gotthold Lessing (1729–1781), writer
 Heinrich Mann (1871–1950), author (brother of Thomas Mann)
 Thomas Mann (1875–1955), author (brother of Heinrich Mann)
 Karl May (1842–1912), author
 Theodor Mommsen (1817–1903), A history of Rome
 Christian Morgenstern (1871–1914), poet
 Novalis (1772–1801), poet and novelist
 Erich Maria Remarque (1898–1970), novelist
 Friedrich Schiller (1759–1805), poet and playwright
 Arno Schmidt (1914–1979), writer
 Theodor Storm (1817–1888), author
 Kurt Tucholsky (1890–1935), writer and satirist
 Walter von der Vogelweide (c. 1170 – c. 1230), poet
 Christa Wolf (1929–2011), novelist and essayist
 Wolfram von Eschenbach (died 1220), poet

Major

 Yehuda Amichai (born Ludwig Pfeuffer; 1924–2000), German-born Israeli poet
 Ernst Moritz Arndt, poet, songwriter and patriot
 Achim von Arnim (1781–1831), poet
 Bettina von Arnim (1785–1859), writer and novelist
 Ezriel Carlebach (1909–1956), Israeli journalist and editorial writer
 Matthias Claudius (1740–1815), poet and writer
 Michael Ende (1929–1995), author of fantasy novels and children's books
 Erik Erikson (1902–1994), German-American writer, developmental psychologist and psychoanalyst
 Anne Frank (1929–1945), diarist and victim of the Holocaust
 Paul Gerhardt (c. 1606 – 1676), hymn writer
 Leah Goldberg (1911–1970), Israeli poet
 Joseph Görres (1776–1848), essayist
 Wilhelm Hauff (1802–1827), writer
 Paul Heyse (1830–1914), writer and translator
 Janosch (born 1931), author of artist and children's books
 Friedrich Kellner (1885–1970), diarist of My Opposition
 Golo Mann (1909–1994), author and historian (second-oldest son of Thomas Mann)
 Klaus Mann (1906–1949), author (oldest son of Thomas Mann)
 Friedrich de la Motte Fouqué (1777–1843), writer
 Prince Hermann von Pückler-Muskau (1785–1871), writer and landscape gardener
 Otfried Preussler (1923–2013), author of children's books
 Wilhelm Raabe (1831–1910), novelist
 Peter Rühmkorf (1929–2008), poet
 Nelly Sachs (1891–1970), poet
 Leopold Schefer (1784–1861), writer, poet and composer
 August Wilhelm Schlegel (1767–1845), poet and translator
 Ludwig Tieck (1773–1853), poet, editor and novelist
 Ludwig Uhland (1787–1862), poet, writer and playwright
 Gero von Wilpert (1933–2009), essayist

Contemporary

 Hans Magnus Enzensberger (1929–2022), essayist and poet
 Günter Grass (1927–2015), author; recipient, 1999 Nobel Prize in Literature
 Peter Härtling (1933–2017), author
 Rolf Hochhuth (1931–2020), playwright
 Wladimir Kaminer (born 1967), short story writer
 Daniel Kehlmann (born 1975), novelist
 Siegfried Lenz (1926–2014), author
 Ferdinand von Schirach (born 1964), author, screenwriter and lawyer
 Bernhard Schlink (born 1944), author and professor of law
 Patrick Süskind (born 1949), author and screenwriter
 Rudolf von Waldenfels (born 1965), author
 Martin Walser (born 1927), playwright and novelist

Humorists, cabaret performers and comedians 

 Dieter Hildebrandt (1927–2013), cabaret performer
 Bruno Jonas (born 1952), cabaret performer
 Michael Mittermeier (born 1966), comedian
 Georg Schramm (born 1949), cabaret performer
 Mathias Richling (born 1953), cabaret performer
 Richard Rogler (born 1949), cabaret performer
 Daniel Tosh (born 1975), comedian

Journalists 

 Rudolf Augstein (1923–2002), journalist
 Peter Limbourg (born 1960), journalist
 Marion Dönhoff (1909–2002), journalist
 Günther Jauch (born 1956), journalist
 Axel Springer (1912–1985), journalist
 Sabine Christiansen (born 1957), journalist
 Maybrit Illner (born 1965), journalist
 Anne Will (born 1966), journalist
 Sandra Maischberger (born 1966), journalist

Mathematicians 

 Wilhelm Ackermann (1896–1962), mathematician
 Georg Cantor (1845–1918), mathematician
 Richard Dedekind (1831–1916), mathematician
 Walther von Dyck (1856–1934), mathematician
 Albert Einstein (1879–1955), mathematician, physicist
 Gottlob Frege (1848–1925), mathematician
 Philipp Furtwängler (1869–1940), mathematician
 Carl Friedrich Gauss (1777–1855), mathematician
 Ernst Hellinger (1883–1950), mathematician
 David Hilbert (1862–1943), mathematician
 Carl Gustav Jacob Jacobi (1804–1851), mathematician
 Erich Kähler (1906–2000), mathematician
 Johannes Kepler (1571–1630), mathematician and astronomer
 Felix Christian Klein (1849–1925), mathematician
 Hermann Klaus Hugo Weyl (1885–1955), mathematician
 Gottfried Wilhelm Leibniz (1646–1716), mathematician
 Kurt Mendelssohn (1906–1980), mathematician
 Hermann Minkowski (1864–1909), mathematician
 August Ferdinand Möbius (1790–1868), mathematician, theoretical astronomer
 Carl Neumann (1832–1925), mathematician
 Emmy Noether (1882–1935), mathematician
 Georg Ohm (1789–1854), mathematician
 Carl Adam Petri (1926–2010), mathematician, computer scientist
 Julius Plücker (1801–1868), mathematician
 Bernhard Riemann (1826–1866), mathematician
 Adam Ries (1492–1559), mathematician, physicist, archeologist
 Gustav Roch (1839–1866) mathematician
 Eric Reissner (1913–1996), mathematician, engineer
 Carl David Tolmé Runge (1856–1927), mathematician, physicist, spectroscopist
 Heinrich Scherk (1798–1885), mathematician
 Herman Schwarz (1843–1921), mathematician
 Carl Ludwig Siegel (1896–1981), mathematician
 Roland Sprague (1894–1967), mathematician
 Heinrich Martin Weber (1842–1913), mathematician
 Karl Weierstrass (1815–1897), mathematician
 Max Zorn (1906–1993), mathematician

Military

 Heinrich Bürkle de la Camp (1895–1974), general who specialized as a medic and army doctor
 Carl von Clausewitz (1780–1831), Prussian professional soldier, military historian, and influential military theorist
 Erich von Falkenhayn (1861–1922), general, Prussian Minister of War (1913–1915) and Chief of General Staff (1914–1916)
Christian Larson 
 August von Gneisenau (1760–1831), Prussian field marshal and chief of the Prussian General Staff (1813–1814)
 Heinz Guderian (1888–1954), military theorist and innovative general (1907–1945)
 Erich Hartmann (1922–1993), fighter pilot and air ace (1941–1970)
 Alfred Jodl (1890–1946), general, operations chief of the OKW
 Günther von Kluge (1882–1944), field marshal and commander of the Fourth Army (1939–1941) and Army Group Center (1941–43)
 Erich Ludendorff (1865–1937), general and Quartermaster General (1916–1918)
 Erich von Manstein (1887–1973), field marshal and professional soldier (1906–1944)
 Helmuth von Moltke the Elder (1800–1891), field marshal, chief of staff of the Prussian Army for thirty years
 Friedrich Paulus (1890–1957), general and commander of the German Sixth Army, later promoted to Field Marshal (1910–1943)
 Günther Rall (1918–2009), third highest scoring fighter ace in history with 275 confirmed kills while serving as a pilot in the Luftwaffe in World War II
 Manfred von Richthofen, also known as the Red Baron (1892–1918), fighter pilot and air ace
 Erwin Rommel (1891–1944), field marshal and commander of Afrika Korps (1942–1943) and Army Group B (1944)
 Albrecht von Roon (1803–1879), field marshal, Minister of War from (1859–1873)
 Hans-Ulrich Rudel (1916–1982), Stuka dive-bomber pilot and air ace (1936–1945)
 Gerd von Rundstedt (1875–1953), field marshal and commander (1892–1945)
 Alfred von Schlieffen (1833–1913), field marshal, Strategist and Chief of General Staff (1891–1905)
 Gerhard von Scharnhorst (1755–1813), general and Prussian Minister of War (1808–1810)
 Michael Wittmann (1914–1944), SS captain and tank ace (1934–1944)

Music

Composers

 Carl Friedrich Abel (1725–1787), composer
 Martin Agricola (1466–1506), composer
 Siegfried Alkan (1858–1941), composer
 Carl Philipp Emanuel Bach (1714–1788), composer; son of Johann Sebastian Bach
 Johann Christian Bach (1735–1782), composer; son of Johann Sebastian Bach
 Johann Sebastian Bach (1685–1750), composer
 Klaus Badelt (born 1967), film composer (Pirates of the Caribbean: The Curse of the Black Pearl, Miami Vice, Ultraviolet, 2008 Summer Olympics closing ceremony in Beijing)
 Ludwig van Beethoven (1770–1827), composer
 Martin Böttcher (1927–2019), film composer (Karl May film adaptations)
 Johannes Brahms (1833–1897), composer
 Max Bruch (1838–1920), composer
 Dieterich Buxtehude (c. 1637/39–1707), Danish-German organist and composer of the Baroque period
 Hanns Eisler (1898–1962), composer
 Friedrich von Flotow (1812–1883), composer
 Christoph Willibald Gluck (1714–1787), composer
 Georg Friedrich Händel (1685–1759), composer, opera composer
 Fanny Hensel (1805–1847), composer
 Paul Hindemith (1895–1963), composer
 Engelbert Humperdinck (1854–1921), composer
 Albert Lortzing (1801–1851), composer
 Giacomo Meyerbeer (1791–1864), composer
 Felix Mendelssohn (1809–1847), composer
 Leopold Mozart (1719–1787), composer, conductor, teacher, and violinist; father of Wolfgang Amadeus Mozart
 Jacques Offenbach (1819–1880), composer
 Carl Orff (1895–1982), composer
 Johann Pachelbel (1653–1706), composer
 Hans Pfitzner (1869–1949), composer
 Max Reger (1873–1916), composer
 Wolfgang Rihm (born 1952), composer
 Leopold Schefer (1784–1862), writer and composer
 Clara Schumann (1819–1896), composer
 Robert Schumann (1810–1856), composer and songwriter
 Heinrich Schütz (1585–1672), composer
 Charlotte Seither (born 1965), classical composer, pianist and music educator
 Karlheinz Stockhausen (1928–2007), modern composer
 Richard Strauss (1864–1949), composer, opera composer
 Georg Philipp Telemann (1681–1767), composer
 Richard Wagner (1813–1883), composer
 Carl Maria von Weber (1786–1826), composer
 Kurt Weill (1900–1950), composer (The Threepenny Opera, "September Song")
 Hans Zimmer (born 1957), film composer (The Lion King, Crimson Tide, Gladiator, The Dark Knight, Inception, Dune)

Conductors, instrumentalists and singers

A–M

 Hans Albers (1891–1960), singer and actor
 Thomas Anders (born 1963), singer
 Lale Andersen (1905–1972), singer
 Lou Bega (born 1975), singer
 Andrea Berg (born 1966), singer-songwriter
 Wolf Biermann (born 1936), singer-songwriter and East German dissident
 Dieter Bohlen (born 1954), music producer
 Andreas Bourani (born 1983), singer-songwriter
 Hans-Jürgen Buchner (born 1944), founder, composer, songwriter of the band Haindling
 Fritz Busch (1890–1951), conductor
 Bushido (born 1978), rapper
 Campino (born 1962), lead singer of the band Die Toten Hosen
 Yvonne Catterfeld (born 1979), singer
 Sarah Connor (born 1980), pop and soul singer
 Michael and Sandra Cretu, founders and performers of the musical project Enigma and the group Sandra
 Diana Damrau, coloratura soprano opera singer
 Marlene Dietrich (1901–1992), singer
 Herbert Dreilich (1942–2004), singer of the Band Karat
 Jürgen Drews (born 1945), singer
 Katja Ebstein (born 1945), singer
 Fancy (born 1946), singer
 Frank Farian (born 1941), German record producer and songwriter
 Helene Fischer (born 1984), singer
 Gertrude Förstel (1880–1950), operatic soprano, voice teacher
 Peter Fox (born 1971), singer
 Wilhelm Furtwängler (1886–1954), conductor and composer
 Rex Gildo (1936–1999), singer
 Bernd Heinrich Graf, lead singer of the Band Unheilig
 Antye Greie (born 1969), vocalist, musician and composer
 Herbert Grönemeyer (born 1956), singer
 Gudrun Gut (born 1957), electronic musician
 Nina Hagen (born 1955), singer
 Heino (born 1938), pop singer
 Willy Hess (1859–1939), violinist
 Natalie Horler (born 1981), member of the band Cascada
 Annette Humpe (born 1950), singer of the bands Ideal and Ich + Ich
 Matthias Jabs (born 1955), guitarist of the band Scorpions
 Roland Kaiser (born 1952), singer
 Bill Kaulitz (born 1989), lead singer of the band Tokio Hotel
 John Kay (musician) (born 1944), German–Canadian musician
 Gershon Kingsley (1922–2019), composer
 Alexander Klaws (born 1983), singer
 Hildegard Knef (1925–2002), singer
 Peter Kraus (born 1939), singer
 Mike Kogel, lead singer of the band Los Bravos
 Rolf Köhler (1951–2007), singer, musician and record producer
 Paul Kuhn (1928–2013), band leader and singer
 LaFee (born 1990), singer
 Ute Lemper (born 1963), singer
 Udo Lindenberg (born 1946), singer
 Michail Lifits (born 1982), concert pianist
 Till Lindemann (born 1963), lead singer of the band Rammstein
 Georg Listing, bassist of the band Tokio Hotel
 Frida Lyngstad, lead singer of the pop group ABBA
 Peter Maffay (born 1949), singer
 Klaus Meine, vocalist of the band Scorpions
 Reinhard Mey (born 1942)
 Lena Meyer-Landrut (born 1991), singer
 Marius Müller-Westernhagen (born 1948), singer
 Karl Münchinger (1915–1990), conductor
 Anne-Sophie Mutter (born 1963), violinist

N–Z

 Xavier Naidoo (born 1971)
 Meshell Ndegeocello (born 1969), born of American parents in Germany
 Nena (born 1960)
 Nicole (born 1964), singer
 Klaus Nomi (1944–1983)
 Lisa Otto (1919–2013), opera singer
 Hedwig Reicher-Kindermann (1853–1883), opera singer
 Martin Rich (1905–2000), conductor and pianist
 Marianne Rosenberg (born 1955), singer-songwriter
 Anneliese Rothenberger (1924–2010), singer
 Sandra (born 1962), singer
 Kool Savas (born 1975), half German, half Turkish singer
 Gustav Schäfer, drummer of the band Tokio Hotel
 Michael Schenker (born 1955), guitar player of band UFO and solo career
 Rudolf Schenker (born 1948), guitarist of the band Scorpions; brother of Michael Schenker
 Peter Schilling (born 1956), singer
 Sido (born 1980), rapper
 Cassandra Steen (born 1980), German-American singer-songwriter, and voice actress
 Farin Urlaub (born 1963), lead singer of the band Die Ärzte
 Lena Valaitis (born 1943), singer
 Paul van Dyk (born 1971), DJ, musician and record producer
 Hannes Wader (born 1943), singer-songwriter
 Claire Waldoff (1884–1957), singer
 Bruno Walter (1876–1962), conductor and composer
 Konstantin Wecker (born 1947), singer-songwriter

Philosophy

Classic

 Theodor Adorno (1903–1969), philosopher, sociologist and composer
 Albertus Magnus (c. 1193 – 1280), medieval philosopher and theologian
 Hannah Arendt (1906–1975), political theorist
 Walter Benjamin (1892–1943)
 Ernst Bloch (1885–1977)
 Jakob Böhme (1575–1624), mystic philosopher
 Franz Brentano (1838–1917), philosopher and psychologist
 Rudolf Carnap (1891–1970), philosopher
 Ernst Cassirer (1874–1945)
 Wilhelm Dilthey (1833–1911), philosopher, historian, psychologist
 Ludwig Feuerbach (1804–1872), philosopher
 Johann Gottlieb Fichte (1762–1814), philosopher
 Gottlob Frege (1848–1925), mathematician, logician and philosopher
 Eduard von Hartmann (1842–1906), philosopher
 Georg Wilhelm Friedrich Hegel (1770–1831), philosopher
 Martin Heidegger (1889–1976), philosopher
 Max Horkheimer (1895–1973)
 Edmund Husserl (1859–1938), philosopher
 Karl Jaspers (1883–1969), philosopher
 Immanuel Kant (1724–1804), philosopher
 Gottfried Leibniz (1646–1716), physicist, philosopher
 Karl Marx (1818–1883), philosopher and sociologist
 Moses Mendelssohn (1729–1786), philosopher
 Lorenz Christoph Mizler (1711–1778), philosopher active in Poland
 Nikolaus Cusanus (1401–1462), philosopher, theologian, mathematician
 Friedrich Nietzsche (1844–1900), early existentialist philosopher
 Friedrich Schelling (1775–1854), philosopher
 Moritz Schlick (1882–1936), philosopher
 Arthur Schopenhauer (1788–1860), philosopher
 Christian Wolff (1679–1754), philosopher

Major

 Bruno Bauer (1809–1882), political theorist and philosopher
 Friedrich Engels (1820–1895), philosopher, political economist
 Rudolf Christoph Eucken (1846–1926), philosopher
 Erich Fromm (1900–1980)
 Hans-Georg Gadamer (1900–2002), philosopher
 Wilhelm von Humboldt (1767–1835), philosopher, linguist, government functionary, diplomat; brother of Alexander von Humboldt
 Ludwig Klages (1872–1956), philosopher
 Leo Löwenthal (1900–1993)
 Karl Löwith (1897–1973)
 Herbert Marcuse (1898–1979)
 Samuel von Pufendorf (1632–1694), moral and political philosopher
 Johann Karl Friedrich Rosenkranz (1805–1879)
 Franz Rosenzweig (1886–1929)
 Max Scheler (1874–1928), philosopher
 Carl Schmitt (1888–1985), political theorist
 Georg Simmel (1859–1918), philosopher and sociologist
 Max Stirner (1806–1856), philosopher
 Carl Friedrich von Weizsäcker (1912–2007), philosopher and physicist

Contemporary

 Hans Albert (born 1921), philosopher
 Kurt Flasch (born 1930), philosopher
 Jürgen Habermas (born 1929), philosopher, social theorist
 Dieter Henrich (1927–2022), philosopher
 Odo Marquard (1928–2015), philosopher
 Julian Nida-Rümelin (born 1954), philosopher and political theorist
 Konrad Ott (born 1959), moral philosopher and environmentalist
 Peter Sloterdijk (born 1947), philosopher and television host
 Robert Spaemann (1927–2018), philosopher
 Oswald Spengler (1880–1936), philosopher of history; best known for his book "The Decline of the West" (Der Untergang des Abendlandes)
 Ernst Tugendhat (1930–2023), philosopher

Politicians

Miscellaneous

 Arminius (18/17 BC – AD 21)
 Rainer Barzel (1924–2006), leader of the party Christian Democratic Union of Germany (CDU)
 August Bebel (1840–1913), co-founder of the Social Democratic Party of Germany
 Rudolf von Bennigsen (1824–1902), founder of the National Liberal Party
 Eduard Bernstein (1850–1932), Social Democratic leader
 Heinrich von Brentano (1904–1964), Foreign Minister Christian Democratic Union of Germany (CDU)
 Julius Curtius (1877–1948), Foreign Minister (German People's Party)
 Matthias Erzberger (1875–1921), Catholic Center party leader
 Joschka Fischer (born 1948), Foreign Minister and vice chancellor 1998–2005 (Bündnis 90/Die Grünen)
 Hans-Dietrich Genscher (1927–2016), former minister for foreign affairs (FDP)
 Jakob Grimm (1785–1863), parliamentarian
 Wilhelm Grimm (1786–1859), parliamentarian
 Gregor Gysi (born 1948), former leader of the Party of Democratic Socialism
 Georg Hornstein (1900–1942), resistance fighter during the period of National Socialism (Nazism)
 Alfred Hugenberg (1865–1951), leader of the German National People's Party
 Johann Jacoby (1805–1877), radical democrat in Prussia
 Luise Kähler (1869–1955), trade union leader, founding member of Socialist Unity Party of Germany (SED)
 Karl Kautsky (1854–1938), Social Democratic leader and theoretician
 Petra Kelly (1947–1992), co-founder of the German Green Party
 Roland Koch (born 1958), Minister-President of Hesse
 Oskar Lafontaine (born 1943), socialist, former minister for finance
 Ferdinand Lassalle (1825–1864), democrat and socialist
 Karl Liebknecht (1871–1919), socialist
 Wilhelm Liebknecht (1826–1900), co-founder of the Social Democratic Party of Germany (SPD)
 Rosa Luxemburg (1870–1919), left-wing Social Democratic leader
 Jakob Maria Mierscheid (born 1933), virtual parliamentarian (SPD)
 Hans Modrow (1928–2023), former leader of GDR, honorary chairman of PDS
 Hermann Müller (1876–1931), Chancellor of the Weimar Republic (SPD)
 Erich Ollenhauer (1901–1963), leader of the Social Democratic Party of Germany (SPD)
 Antonie "Toni" Pfülf (1877–1933), female socialist (SPD)
 Walther Rathenau (1867–1922), foreign minister (DDP)
 Eugen Richter (1838–1906), liberal politician
 Wolfgang Schäuble (born 1942), Christian politician, financial minister (CDU)
 Carlo Schmid (1896–1979), politician who had vast influence on the content of the German Basic Law after World War II
 Gerhard Schröder (1910–1989), foreign minister, minister of the Interior (CDU)
 Kurt Schumacher (1895–1952), leader of the Social Democratic Party of Germany in the early years of the FRG
 Baron Heinrich vom Stein (1757–1831)
 Edmund Stoiber (born 1941), party leader of the CSU and former minister president of Bavaria
 Franz Josef Strauss (1915–1988), Bavarian politician (CSU)
 Ernst Thälmann (1886–1944), leader of the Communist Party of Germany during the Weimar period
 Hans-Jochen Vogel (1926–2020), leader of the Social Democratic Party of Germany (SPD), federal minister of justice
 Otto Wels (1873–1939), leader of the Social Democratic Party of Germany (SPD)
 Guido Westerwelle (1961–2016), party leader of the liberal party (FDP)
 Klaus Wowereit (born 1953), social democrat politician (SPD)
 Clara Zetkin (1857–1933), socialist and fighter for women's rights

Chancellors of Germany 1871–1945

 Gustav Bauer (1870–1944), chancellor of the Weimar Republic (SPD)
 Theobald von Bethmann Hollweg (1856–1921), Imperial Chancellor
 Otto von Bismarck (1815–1898), Imperial Chancellor
 Heinrich Brüning (1885–1970), Chancellor of the Weimar Republic (Centre Party)
 Bernhard von Bülow (1849–1929), Imperial Chancellor
 Leo von Caprivi (1831–1899), Imperial Chancellor
 Wilhelm Cuno (1876–1933), Chancellor of the Weimar Republic
 Konstantin Fehrenbach (1852–1926), Chancellor of the Weimar Republic (Centre)
 Georg von Hertling (1843–1919), Imperial Chancellor
 Adolf Hitler (1889–1945), Leader of Nazi Germany, combining legally the offices of President and Chancellor ("Führer und Reichskanzler") (1933–1945)
 Prince Chlodwig zu Hohenlohe-Schillingsfürst (1819–1901), Imperial Chancellor
 Hans Luther (1885–1962), Chancellor of the Weimar Republic
 Wilhelm Marx (1863–1946), Chancellor of the Weimar Republic (Centre)
 Prince Maximilian of Baden (1867–1929), Last Imperial Chancellor
 Georg Michaelis (1857–1936), Imperial Chancellor
 Franz von Papen (1879–1969), Chancellor of the Weimar Republic
 Philipp Scheidemann (1865–1939), Chancellor of Weimar Republic (SPD)
 Kurt von Schleicher (1882–1934), last Chancellor of the Weimar Republic
 Gustav Stresemann (1878–1929), Chancellor of the Weimar Republic (DVP)
 Joseph Wirth (1879–1956), Chancellor of the Weimar Republic (Centre)

Chancellors of Germany (after World War II)
(in chronological order)

 Konrad Adenauer (1876–1967), first democratically elected Federal Chancellor in Western Germany (after World War II) from 1949 to 1963 (Christian-Democratic Union, CDU)
 Ludwig Erhard (1897–1977), Federal Chancellor from 1963 to 1966 (CDU)
 Kurt Georg Kiesinger (1904–1988), Federal Chancellor from 1966 to 1969 (CDU)
 Willy Brandt (1913–1992), Federal Chancellor from 1969 to 1974 (Social Democratic Party, SPD)
 Helmut Schmidt (1918–2015), Federal Chancellor from 1974 to 1982 (SPD)
 Helmut Kohl (1930–2017), Federal Chancellor from 1982 to 1998 (CDU)
 Gerhard Schröder (born 1944), Federal Chancellor from 1998 to 2005 (SPD)
 Angela Merkel (born 1954), Federal Chancellor from 2005 to 2021 (CDU)
 Olaf Scholz (born 1958), Federal Chancellor since 2021 (SPD)

Presidents of Germany
(in chronological order)

 Friedrich Ebert (1871–1925), first president of the Weimar Republic (SPD) 1919–25
 Paul von Hindenburg (1847–1934), field marshal, president 1925–34
 Adolf Hitler (1889–1945), combining legally both offices, president and chancellor ("Führer und Reichskanzler") 1933–45
 Karl Dönitz (1891–1980), Admiral of the Fleet, after Hitler's death, president for 22 days, 1945

Presidents of the Federal Republic of Germany since 1949:
(in chronological order)

 Theodor Heuss (1884–1963), Federal President 1949–59 (Liberal-Democratic Party, FDP)
 Heinrich Lübke (1894–1972), Federal President 1959–69 (CDU)
 Gustav Heinemann (1899–1976), Federal President 1969–74 (SPD)
 Walter Scheel (1919–2016), Federal President 1974–79 (FDP)
 Karl Carstens (1914–1992), Federal President 1979–84 (CDU)
 Richard von Weizsäcker (1920–2015), Federal President 1984–94 (CDU)
 Roman Herzog (1934–2017), Federal President 1994–99 (CDU)
 Johannes Rau (1931–2006), Federal President 1999–2004 (SPD)
 Horst Köhler (born 1943), Federal President 2004–10 (CDU)
 Jens Böhrnsen (born 1949), acting president since resignation of Köhler in 2010 (SPD)
 Christian Wulff (born 1959), Federal President 2010–12 (CDU)
 Horst Seehofer (born 1949), acting president since resignation of Wulff in 2012 (CDU)
 Joachim Gauck (born 1940), Federal President 2012–2017 (Independent)
 Frank-Walter Steinmeier (born 1956) Federal President since 19 March 2017 (SPD)

Politicians of the East German Communist Party and regime

 Otto Grotewohl (1894–1964), minister president of the GDR
 Erich Honecker (1912–1994), leader of the GDR until 1989
 Egon Krenz (born 1937), leader of the GDR after Honecker
 Erich Mielke (1907–2000), head of the Stasi
 Wilhelm Pieck (1876–1960), first president of the GDR
 Heinrich Rau (1899–1961), chairman of the German Economic Commission (predecessor of the East German government)
 Günter Schabowski (1929–2015), member of politburo
 Willy Stoph (1914–1999), premier of the GDR
 Walter Ulbricht (1893–1973), leader of the GDR

Personalities of the Nazi Party and regime

 Artur Axmann (1913–1996), Hitler Youth leader (1940–1945)
 Klaus Barbie (1913–1991), the "Butcher of Lyon"
 Fedor von Bock (1880–1945), field marshal
 Martin Bormann (1900–1945), Nazi leader
 Eva Braun (1912–1945), Hitler's mistress and finally his wife
 Wilhelm Canaris (1887–1945), admiral and chief of the Abwehr
 Karl Dönitz (1891–1980), Admiral of the Fleet, briefly Hitler's successor as President
 Anton Drexler (1884–1942), founder of German Workers' Party, which became the NSDAP
 Adolf Eichmann (1906–1962), Nazi SS-Obersturmbannführer (lieutenant colonel)
 Hans Frank (1900–1946), Governor-General of Poland
 Roland Freisler (1893–1945), Nazi judge
 Wilhelm Frick (1877–1946), Minister of the Interior
 Walther Funk (1890–1960), Minister of Economics
 Joseph Goebbels (1897–1945), Chancellor of Germany, propaganda chief for the Nazis
 Hermann Göring (1893–1946), Nazi, Reich Marshal and chief of Luftwaffe
 Rudolf Hess (1894–1987), Hitler's private secretary, later Deputy Führer
 Reinhard Heydrich (1904–1942), Nazi officer, head of the Sicherheitsdienst and RSHA
 Heinrich Himmler (1900–1945), Nazi head of the SS
 Rudolf Höss (1900–1947), commandant of Auschwitz
 Ernst Kaltenbrunner (1903–1946), Heydrich's successor at the RSHA
 Hans Kammler (1901 – c. 1945), author and organiser of first Death Camps
 Wilhelm Keitel (1882–1946), field marshal, head of the OKW (1939–1945)
 Karl Otto Koch (1897–1945), German first commandant of the Buchenwald concentration camp
 Robert Ley (1890–1945), head of the German Labour Front
 Erich von Manstein (1885–1973), field marshal and commander of the Eleventh Army (1941–1942), Army Group Don (1942–43), and Army Group South (1943–1944)
 Josef Mengele (1911–1979), German SS officer and a physician in the Nazi concentration camp Auschwitz
 Erhard Milch (1892–1972), Göring's second-in-command, Air Inspector General
 Walter Model (1891–1945), field marshal
 Heinrich Müller (1900–1945?), head of the Gestapo (1939–1945)
 Konstantin von Neurath (1873–1956), Foreign Minister in the early years of the regime
 Franz von Papen (1879–1969), Deputy Chancellor in Hitler's first cabinet
 Erich Raeder (1876–1960), Admiral of the Fleet
 Joachim von Ribbentrop (1893–1946), Nazi foreign minister
 Ernst Röhm (1887–1934), first Stabschef of the SA
 Erwin Rommel (1891–1944), Commander of the 7th Panzer Division and the Afrika Korps
 Alfred Rosenberg (1893–1946), Nazi ideologist
 Gerd von Rundstedt (1875–1953), field marshal, Commander-in-Chief East (1939–40), commander of Army Group South (1939–1941), Commander-in-Chief West (1942–1945)
 Hjalmar Schacht, Minister of Finance
 Baldur von Schirach (1907–1974), first Hitler Youth leader
 Albert Speer (1905–1981), "Hitler's architect", Minister of Armaments
 Gregor Strasser (1892–1934), left-wing Nazi leader
 Julius Streicher (1885–1946), Nazi Party leader in Franconia

Royalty

 Alix of Hesse and Rhine (1872–1918), German princess by birth before marrying Tsar Nicholas II to become a Russian tsarina
 Albert of Saxe-Coburg-Gotha (1819–1861), Queen Victoria's husband and consort
 Albert (1828–1902), King of Saxony (1873–1902)
 Anne of Cleves (1515–1557), Queen of England from 6 January to 9 July 1540 as the fourth wife of King Henry VIII
 Anton (1755–1836), King of Saxony (1827–1836)
 Carol I of Hohenzollern-Sigmaringen (1839–1914), Prince (1867–1881) and King (1881–1914) of Romania
 Catherine the Great (1729–1796), Empress of Russia
 Charles IV (1316–1378), King of Germany 1346, Holy Roman Emperor 1355–78
 Charles V (1500–1558), King of Spain 1516, King of Germany 1519, Holy Roman Emperor 1530–56
 Charles (1823–1891), King of Württemberg (1823–1891)
 Claus von Amsberg (1926–2002), diplomat and husband of Queen Beatrix of the Netherlands
 Ferdinand of Hohenzollern-Sigmaringen (1865–1927), King of Romania (1924–1927)
 Ferdinand of Saxe-Coburg-Gotha (1861–1948), Prince of Bulgaria (1887–1908), King (or Tsar) of the Bulgarians (1908–1918)
 Frederick I Barbarossa (1122–1190), King of Germany 1152, Holy Roman Emperor 1155–90
 Frederick I of Prussia (1657–1713), Elector of Brandenburg (1688–1713), King in Prussia (1701–1713)
 Frederick I of Württemberg (1754–1816), Duke (1797–1803), Elector (1803–1806), and King (1806–1816) of Württemberg
 Frederick II, Holy Roman Emperor (1194–1250), Holy Roman Emperor and King of Jerusalem
 Frederick II of Prussia (1712–1786), King of Prussia (1740–1786)
 Friedrich III (1831–1888), German Emperor and King of Prussia (1888)
 Frederick Augustus I (1750–1827), Elector (1763–1806) and King (1806–1827) of Saxony
 Frederick Augustus II (1797–1854), King of Saxony (1836–1854)
 Frederick Augustus III (1865–1932), King of Saxony (1904–1918)
 Frederick William I (1688–1740), King of Prussia (1713–1740)
 Frederick William II (1744–1797), King of Prussia (1786–1797)
 Frederick William III (1770–1840), King of Prussia (1797–1840)
 Frederick William IV (1795–1861), King of Prussia (1840–1861)
 George (1832–1904), King of Saxony (1902–1904)
 George V (1819–1878), King of Hanover (1851–1866)
 Henry I the Fowler (876–936), King of Germany 919
 Henry II (972–1024), King of Germany 1002, Holy Roman Emperor 1014–24
 Henry III (1017–1056), King of Germany 1039, Holy Roman Emperor 1046–56
 Henry IV (1050–1106), King of Germany 1056, Holy Roman Emperor 1084–1106
 Henry V (1081–1125), King of Germany 1106, Holy Roman Emperor 1111–25
 Henry VI (1165–1197), King of Germany 1190, Holy Roman Emperor 1191–97
 John (1801–1873), King of Saxony (1854–1873)
 Louis IV (1281–1347), King of Germany 1314, Holy Roman Emperor 1328–47
 Ludwig I (1786–1868), King of Bavaria (1825–1848)
 Ludwig II (1845–1886), King of Bavaria (1864–1886)
 Ludwig III (1845–1921), King of Bavaria (1913–1918)
 Maximilian I (1459–1519), King of Germany 1486, Holy Roman Emperor 1508–19
 Maximilian I (1756–1825), Elector (1799–1805) and King (1805–1825) of Bavaria
 Maximilian II (1811–1864), King of Bavaria (1848–1864)
 Otto I the Great (912–973), King of Germany 936, Holy Roman Emperor 962–973
 Otto II (955–983), Holy Roman Emperor 973–983
 Otto III (980–1002), King of Germany 983, Holy Roman Emperor 996–1002
 Otto of Greece King of Bavaria (1815–1867), King of the Hellenes (1833–1862)
 Otto of Bavaria (1848–1916), King of Bavaria (1886–1913)
 Wilhelm I (1797–1888), German Emperor (1871–1888) and King of Prussia (1861–1888)
 Wilhelm II (1859–1941), German Emperor and King of Prussia (1888–1918)
 William I (1781–1864), King of Württemberg (1816–1864)
 William II (1848–1921), King of Württemberg (1891–1918)

Scientists and engineers

A–G

 Otto Wilhelm Hermann von Abich (1806–1886), mineralogist, geologist
Michael Albeck (born 1934), Israeli chemist; President of Bar-Ilan University
 Alois Alzheimer (1864–1915), psychiatrist and neuropathologist
 Peter Apian (1495–1552), mathematician, astronomer and cartographer
 Manfred von Ardenne (1907–1997), physicist
 Anton de Bary (1831–1888), surgeon, botanist, microbiologist
 Johann Bayer (1572–1625), astronomer
 Henning Behrens (born 1940), economist and political scientist
 Georg Bednorz (born 1950), physicist Nobel Prize for Physics
 Emil von Behring (1854–1917), physician
 Karl Benz (1844–1929), inventor of the gasoline-powered automobile
 Friedrich Bessel (1784–1846), mathematician
 Hans Bethe (1906–2005), physicist
 Hennig Brand (c. 1630 c.1692 or c. 1710), alchemist; discoverer of phosphorus
 Max Born (1882–1970), physicist
 Robert Bosch (1861–1942), industrialist
 Carl F. W. Borgward (1890–1963), engineer
 Karl Ferdinand Braun (1850–1918), physicist
 Wernher von Braun (1912–1977), space engineer, rocket scientist
 Eduard Buchner (1860–1917), biochemist; recipient 1907 Nobel Prize for Chemistry for the discovery of enzymes
 Robert Wilhelm Bunsen (1811–1899), chemist
 Alfred Buntru (1887–1974), hydraulic engineer and SS officer
 Georg Cantor (1845–1918), mathematician
 Conrad of Leonberg (1460–1511), humanist scholar
 Nicolaus Copernicus (1473–1543), Prussian astronomer who wrote and spoke German; he is also often considered as a Pole
 Hans Gerhard Creutzfeldt, neuropathologist
 Adolf Daimler (1871–1913), mechanical engineer
 Gottlieb Daimler (1834–1900), inventor and engineer
 Gertrud Dorka (1893–1976), archaeologist, prehistorian and museum director
 Carl Duisberg (1861–1935), chemist and industrialist
 Rudolf Diesel (1858–1913), inventor of the Diesel engine
 Paul Ehrlich (1854–1915), physician
 Albert Einstein (1879–1955), physicist
 Gerhard Ertl (born 1936), physicist
 Hans Jürgen Eysenck (1916–1997), psychologist
 Daniel Gabriel Fahrenheit (1686–1736), physicist, engineer, and glass blower
 Adolf Eugen Fick (1829–1901), inventor of contact lenses
 Wolfgang Finkelnburg (1905–1967), physicist
 Hermann Emil Fischer (1852–1919), chemist and 1902 recipient of the Nobel Prize in Chemistry
 Friederike Fless (born 1964), president of the German Archaeological Institute
 Elvira Fölzer (1868–1928), early female archaeologist
 Joseph von Fraunhofer (1787–1826), physicist
 Gottlob Frege (1848–1925), mathematician and logicist
 Wilhelm Siegmund Frei (1885–1943), dermatologist
 Erich Fromm (1900–1980), psychologist
 Klaus Fuchs (1911–1988), physicist and spy
 Hans Geiger (1882–1945), physicist
 Carl Friedrich Gauss (1777–1855), mathematician
 Otto von Guericke (1602–1682), scientist
 Johannes Gutenberg (1398–1468), inventor of modern bookprinting

H–J

 Fritz Haber (1868–1934), chemist
 Ernst Haeckel (1834–1919), physician
 Otto Hahn (1879–1968), chemist
 Theodor W. Hänsch (born 1941), physicist
 Bernhard Hantzsch (1875–1911), ornithologist
 Georg Hartmann (1865–1946), geographer
 Felix Hausdorff (1868–1942), mathematician
 Robert Havemann (1910–1982), chemist
 Ernst Heinkel (1888–1958), aircraft engineer
 Werner Karl Heisenberg (1901–1976), physicist
 Hermann Helmholtz, physicist
 Heinrich Rudolf Hertz (1857–1894), physicist
 Johannes Hevelius (1611–1687), astronomer
 David Hilbert (1862–1943), mathematician
 Magnus Hirschfeld (1868–1935), physician, sexologist, founder of the first ever committee for LGBTQ+ rights
 Johann Homann (1664–1724), geographer
 Erich Hueckel (1896–1980), physicist
 Alexander von Humboldt (1769–1859), explorer
 Carl Gustav Jacob Jacobi (1804–1851), mathematician
 Alfons Maria Jakob (1884–1931), neurologist
 Hugo Junkers (1859–1935), aircraft engineer

K–L

 Theodor Kaluza (1885–1954), mathematician, theoretical physicist
 Friedrich August Kekulé von Stradonitz (1829–1896), chemist
 Johannes Kepler (1571–1630), astronomer
 Gustav Robert Kirchhoff (1824–1887), physicist
 Martin Heinrich Klaproth (1743–1817), chemist
 Felix Klein (1849–1925), mathematician
 Klaus von Klitzing (born 1943), physicist, Nobel Prize in Physics
 Wolfgang Franz von Kobell (1803–1882), mineralogist
 Robert Koch (1843–1910), physician
 Walter Karl Koch (1880–1962), surgeon
 Adolph Wilhelm Hermann Kolbe (1818–1884), chemist
 Leopold Kronecker (1823–1891), mathematician
 Ernst Eduard Kummer (1810–1893), mathematician
 Edmund Landau (1877–1938), mathematician
 Hermann Lattemann (1852–1894), balloon pilot and parachutist
 Max von Laue (1879–1960), physicist
 Gottfried Wilhelm Leibniz (1646–1716), mathematician
 Philipp Eduard Anton von Lenard (1862–1947), physicist
 Rudolph Lennhoff (1866–1933), public health doctor 
 August Leskien (1840–1916), linguist
 Justus von Liebig (1803–1873), chemist
 Otto Lilienthal (1848–1896), aviation pioneer
 Ferdinand von Lindemann (1852–1939), mathematician
 Alexander Lippisch (1894–1976), aerodynamicist
 Friedrich Loeffler (1852–1915), bacteriologist
 Johann Josef Loschmidt (1821–1895), physicist, chemist
 Cornelia Lüdecke (born 1954), polar researcher, historian
 Reimar Lüst (1923–2020), astrophysicist

M–R

 (Albertus Magnus see "A")
 Ludwig Immanuel Magnus, mathematician
 Siegfried Marcus (1831–1898), automobile pioneer
 Wilhelm Maybach (1846–1929), car-engine and automobile constructor
 Wilhelm Messerschmitt (1898–1978), aircraft engineer
 Lothar Meyer (1830–1895), chemist
 Franz Mertens (1840–1927), mathematician
 August Ferdinand Möbius (1790–1868), mathematician, theoretical astronomer
 Johannes Müller (1801–1858), physiologist
 Walther Nernst (1864–1941), physicist
 Carl Gottfried Neumann (1832–1925), mathematician
 Franz Ernst Neumann (1798–1895), mathematician
 Claus Noé (1938–2008), economist
 Emmy Noether (1882–1935), mathematician
 Georg Ohm (1789–1854), physicist
 Wilhelm Ostwald, chemist; recipient 1909 Nobel Prize in Chemistry
 Nicolaus Otto (1832–1891), coinventor of the Otto cycle
 Bernhard Philberth (1927–2010), physicist, engineer, philosopher, theologian
 Max Planck (1858–1947), physicist
 Jesco von Puttkamer (1933–2012), space scientist (NASA manager), engineer and author
 Bernhard Riemann (1826–1866), mathematician
 Adam Ries (1492–1559), mathematician
 Wilhelm Röntgen (1845–1923), physicist; inventor of x-rays

S–V

 Carl Wilhelm Scheele (1742–1786), chemist
 Matthias Jakob Schleiden (1804–1881), botanist
 Heinrich Schliemann (1822–1890), archaeologist
 Christian Friedrich Schonbein (1799–1868), chemist
 Friedrich Hermann Schottky (1851–1935), mathematician
 Theodor Schwann (1810–1882), physiologist
 Hermann Amandus Schwarz (1843–1921), mathematician
 Karl Schwarzschild (1873–1916), physicist
 Carl Semper (1832–1893), ecologist
 Cynthia Sharma (born 1979), infectious disease researcher, biologist 
 Werner von Siemens (1816–1892), inventor, industrialist
 Rolf Singer (1906–1994), mycologist
 Arnold Sommerfeld (1868–1951), physicist
 Eduard Adolf Strasburger (1844–1912), German-Polish professor; one of the most famous botanists of the 19th century
 Georg Steller (1709–1746), naturalist
 William Stern (1871–1938), psychologist, philosopher
 Alfred Stock (1876–1946), chemist
 Levi Strauss (1829–1902), jeans
 Max Vasmer (1886–1962), linguist
 Rudolf Virchow (1821–1902), pioneer of medicine

W–Z

 Otto Wallach, physicist
 Hellmuth Walter (1900–1980), propulsion
 Felix Wankel (1902–1988), inventor of the Wankel engine
 Alfred Wegener (1880–1930), geologist, meteorologist
 Karl Weierstrass (1815–1897), mathematician
 August Weismann (1834–1914), biologist
 Carl Friedrich von Weizsäcker (1912–2007), physicist
 Hermann Weyl (1885–1955), mathematician
 Maximilian zu Wied-Neuwied (1782–1867), zoologist
 Wilhelm Wien (1864–1928), physicist
 Heinrich Wohlwill (1874–1943), electrical engineer
 Mieczysław Wolfke (1883–1947), Polish physicist of German descent
 Wilhelm Wundt (1832–1920), physiologist, psychologist
 Christian Zeller (1822–1899, Rektor), mathematician
 Ferdinand von Zeppelin (1838–1917), inventor of the Zeppelin, founded the Zeppelin Airship company
 Ernst Zermelo (1871–1953), mathematician
 Konrad Zuse (1910–1995), computer pioneer

Sportspeople

A–G

 Franziska van Almsick (born 1978), swimmer
 Adolf Anderssen (1818–1879), chess grandmaster
 Tobias Arlt (born 1987), luger
 Rudi Ball (1911–1975), Hall of Fame ice hockey player, Olympic bronze 1932, World runner-up 1930, bronze 1934
 Michael Ballack (born 1976), football player
 Karin Balzer (1938–2019), hurdler
 Marcel Barthel (born 1990), professional wrestler
 Dieter Baumann (born 1965), athlete
 Franz Beckenbauer (born 1945), football player
 Boris Becker (born 1967), tennis player
 Ludger Beerbaum (born 1963), equestrian; four-time Olympic Gold medalist
 Elly Beinhorn (1907–2007), aviator 
 Valery Belenky (born 1969), Soviet/Azerbaijan/German Olympic gymnastics champion (team combined exercises), bronze (individual combined exercises)
 Isaac Bonga, NBA player
 Stefan Bellof (1957–1985), race car driver
 Gretel Bergmann (1914–2017), internationally renowned high jumper of the 1930s was excluded from the 1936 Olympic team due to being Jewish.
 Frank Biela (born 1964), race car driver
 Oliver Bierhoff (born 1968), football player
 Jérôme Boateng (born 1988), football player
 Timo Boll, table tennis player
 Kathrin Boron (born 1969), scmomuller; four-time Olympic gold medallist
 Daryl Boyle (born 1987), ice hockey player for Germany
 Andreas Brehme (born 1960), football player and coach
 Paul Breitner (born 1951), football player
 Kai Budde (born 1979), professional Magic: The Gathering player
 Bettina Bunge (born 1963), tennis player
 Rudolf Caracciola (1901–1959), race car driver
 Rolf Decker, German-born American, football midfielder (US national team)
 Uschi Disl (born 1970), biathlete
 Leon Draisaitl (born 1995), ice hockey player
 Heike Drechsler (born 1964), athlete
 Mathew Dumba (born 1994), ice hockey player
 Stefan Effenberg (born 1968), football player
 Christian Ehrhoff (born 1982), Olympian and National Hockey League hockey player; plays for the Buffalo Sabres
David Elsner (born 1992), ice hockey forward
 Erich Gottlieb Eliskases (1913–1997), leading chess player of the 1930s–40s, represented Austria, Germany and Argentina in international competition
 Kornelia Ender (born 1958), swimmer; became the first woman swimmer to win four gold medals at a single Olympic Games (in 1976), all in world record times
 Karin Enke (born 1961), speed skater; one of the most dominant of the 1980s
 Jürgen Fanghänel (born 1951), boxer
 Rudi Fink (born 1958), boxer
 Birgit Fischer (born 1962), kayaker
 Sven Fischer (born 1971), biathlete
 Theodor Fischer, Olympic épée and foil fencer 
 Alfred Flatow (1869–1942), gymnast, three-time Olympic champion (parallel bars, team parallel bars, team horizontal bar), silver (horizontal bar)
 Gustav Felix Flatow (1875–1945), two-time Olympic champion (team parallel bars, team horizontal bar)
 Heinz-Harald Frentzen (born 1967), racing driver
 Torsten Frings (born 1976), football player
 Gottfried Fuchs (1889–1972), Olympic football player
 Erika Geisen, IFBB professional bodybuilder
 Natalie Geisenberger (born 1988), luger
 Marcel Goc, German Olympian and NHL hockey player; plays for the Nashville Predators
 Harold Goldsmith, born Hans Goldschmidt (1930–2004), American Olympic foil and épée fencer
 Mario Gómez (born 1985), football player
 Steffi Graf (born 1969), tennis player
 Michael Greis (born 1976), biathlete
 Michael Gross (born 1964), swimmer
 Ricco Groß (born 1970), biathlete
 Jan Gustafsson (born 1979), chess grandmaster and Janistan head of state
 Ludwig Guttmann (1899–1980), founder of the Paralympics

H–M

 Tommy Haas (born 1978), tennis player
 Georg Hackl (born 1966), luger
 Hans Halberstadt (1885–1966), German-born American Olympic fencer
 Dietmar Hamann (born 1973), football player
 Sven Hannawald (born 1974), ski jumper
 Armin Hary (born 1937), athlete
 Thomas Häßler (born 1966), football player 
 Nico Hülkenberg (born 1987), racing driver
 Nick Heidfeld (born 1977), racing driver
 Lilli Henoch (1899–1942), world records in discus, shot put, and 4x100-m relay; shot by the Nazis in Latvia
 Jupp Heynckes (born 1945), retired footballer and current manager of FC Bayern Munich
 Julius Hirsch (1892–1945), Olympian football player and first Jewish member of the national team, two-time Germany team champion, awarded the Iron Cross during World War I, murdered in Auschwitz concentration camp.
 Ottmar Hitzfeld (born 1949), football player and manager
 Leah Horowitz (1933–1956), Israeli Olympic hurdler
 Mats Hummels (born 1988), football player
 Peter Hussing (1948–2012), boxer
 Robert Hübner (born 1948), chess grandmaster
 Reinhold Joest (born 1937), race car driver and racing team owner
 Klaus Junge (1924–1945), one of the youngest German chess grandmasters
 Enriko Kehl (born 1992), muay thai kickboxing
 Oliver Kahn (born 1969), football player
 Andy Kapp (born 1967), curler
 Fritz Keller (born 1957), football administrator
 Udo Kiessling (born 1955), first ice hockey player to compete at five Olympics
 Herbert Klein (1923–2001), Olympic bronze (200-m breaststroke); three world records
 Ralph Klein (1931–2008), Berlin-born Israeli basketball player and coach
 Jutta Kleinschmidt, rally driver
 Reiner Klimke (1936–1999), equestrian; won six gold and two bronze medals in dressage at the Summer Olympics
 Jürgen Klinsmann (born 1964), football player and manager 
 Jürgen Klopp (born 1967), Liverpool football manager
 Miroslav Klose (born 1978), football player
 Georg Koch (born 1972), football player
 Marita Koch (born 1957), sprint track and field athlete who collected 30 world records
 Olaf Kölzig (born 1970), German Olympian and National Hockey League goalie; plays for the Tampa Bay Lightning
 Andreas Köpke (born 1962), football player (goalkeeper)
 Louis Krages (1949–2001), racing driver who raced under the pseudonym of "John Winter"
 Ingrid Krämer (born 1943), diver and Olympic champion
 Toni Kroos (born 1990), football player
 Uwe Krupp (born 1965), ice hockey player and coach; won the Stanley Cup and played in an NHL All-Star Game
 Erich Kühnhackl (born 1950), ice hockey player; named Germany's ice hockey player of the 20th century and member of the IIHF Hall of Fame
 Kevin Kuske (born 1979), bobsledder; most successful Olympic athlete in bobsledding, winning four gold medals and two silver medals
 Philipp Lahm (born 1983), football player
 André Lange, bobsledding champion
 Hermann Lang (1909–1987), champion race car driver
 Bernhard Langer (born 1957), golfer
 Henry Laskau (1916–2000), racewalker; won 42 national titles; Pan American Games champion; four-time Maccabiah champion
 Emanuel Lasker (1868–1941), the second World Chess Champion (1894–1921)
 Jens Lehmann (born 1969), football player (goalkeeper)
 Ellen Lohr, racing driver
 Joachim Löw (born 1960), football player and manager of Germany
 Klaus Ludwig, racing driver
 Marion Lüttge (born 1941), javelin thrower
 Brooks Macek (born 1992), ice hockey player for Germany
 Felix Magath (born 1953), football player and manager
 Sepp Maier (born 1944), football player
 Jan Martín (born 1984), German-Israeli-Spanish basketball player
 Henry Maske (born 1964), boxer
 Jochen Mass, racing driver
 Lothar Matthäus (born 1961), football player
 Roland Matthes (1950–2019), swimmer and the most successful backstroke swimmer of all times
 Helene Mayer (1910–1953), foil fencer, Olympic champion
 Georg Meier (1910–1999), motorcycle racer
 Yona Melnik (born 1949), Israeli Olympic judoka
 Markus Merk (born 1962), top-level football referee
 Christoph Metzelder (born 1980), football player
 Ulrike Meyfarth (born 1956), high jumper
 Rosi Mittermaier (1950–2023), alpine ski champion
 Andreas Möller (born 1967), football player
 Gerd Müller (born 1945), football player
 Jörg Müller (born 1969), race car driver
 Petra Müller (born 1965), athlete
 Thomas Müller (born 1989), football player

N–R

 Patricia Neske (born 1966), figure skater
 Günter Netzer (born 1944), football player
 Manuel Neuer (born 1986), football player (goalkeeper)
 Gunda Niemann-Stirnemann (born 1966), speed skater
 Aron Nimzowitsch (1886–1935), Latvian-Danish German chess master and chess writer
 Dirk Nowitzki (born 1978), National Basketball Association player
 Kristin Otto (born 1966), Olympic swimming champion
 Sylke Otto (born 1969), luger
 Mesut Özil (born 1988), football player
 Claudia Pechstein (born 1972), speed skater
 Uta Pippig (born 1965), athlete
 Lukas Podolski (born 1985), football player
 Sarah Poewe (born 1983), swimmer, Olympic bronze (4 × 100 medley relay)
 Ellen Preis (Ellen Müller-Preis) (1912–2007), German-born Austrian Olympic champion foil fencer
 Daniel Prenn (1904–1991), tennis player, highest world ranking # 6
 Birgit Prinz (born 1977), football player
 Lina Radke (1903–1983), athlete
 Teodor Regedziński (also known as Theodor Reger) (1894–1954), Polish chess master of German origin; father's name was Reger
 Otto Rehhagel (born 1938), football player and manager
 Annegret Richter (born 1950), athlete
 Lars Riedel (born 1967), athlete
 Maria Höfl-Riesch (born 1984), World Cup alpine ski racer
 Jochen Rindt (1942–1970), German-born racing driver who represented Austria during his career (one-time World Champion)
 Walter Röhrl, rally and racing driver (two-time Rally World Champion)
 Nico Rosberg (born 1985), former German–Finnish Formula One driver (one-time World Champion)
 Bernd Rosemeyer (1909–1938), racing driver
 Karl-Heinz Rummenigge (born 1955), football player

S–Z

 Matthias Sammer (born 1967), football player and manager who won the 1996 Ballon d'Or
 Thomas Schaaf (born 1961), football player and manager
 Max Schmeling (1905–2005), World Heavyweight Boxing Champion
 Paul Felix Schmidt (1916–1984), Estonian–German chess master
 Martin Schmitt (born 1978), ski jumper
 Bernd Schneider, football player
 Bernd Schneider, racing driver
 Mehmet Scholl (born 1970), football player
 Anja Schreiner, IFBB professional bodybuilder
 Detlef Schrempf (born 1963), former NBA player
 Carl Schuhmann (1869–1946), won four Olympic titles in gymnastics and wrestling at the 1896 Summer Olympics; becoming the most successful athlete at the inaugural Olympics of the modern era
 Harald Schumacher (born 1954), football player
 Michael Schumacher (born 1969), racing driver (seven-time Formula One World Champion)
 Ralf Schumacher (born 1975), racing driver; brother of Michael Schumacher 
 Dennis Schröder, NBA player
 Ralf Schumann (born 1962), pistol shooter
 Bernd Schuster (born 1959), football player and manager
 Rainer Schüttler, tennis player
 Armin Schwarz (born 1963), racing driver
 Bastian Schweinsteiger (born 1984), football player
 Werner Seelenbinder (1904–1944), wrestler
 Uwe Seeler (1936–2022), football player
 Dennis Seidenberg (born 1981), ice hockey player
 Katja Seizinger, alpine ski champion
 Wolfgang Stark (born 1969), football referee
 Renate Stecher (born 1950), athlete
 Britta Steffen (born 1983), swimmer; three-time Olympic medalist
 Michael Stich (born 1968), tennis player
 Rolf Stommelen (1943–1983), racing driver
 Hans Stuck (1900–1978), racing driver
 Hans-Joachim Stuck, racing driver and son of Hans
 Marco Sturm (born 1978), ice hockey player and coach; one-time NHL All-Star (1999)
 Siegbert Tarrasch (1862–1934), chess grandmaster
 Joseph Taussig (1877–1947), German-born American football quarterback
 Axel Teichmann (born 1979), cross-country skier
 Richard Teichmann (1868–1925), leading German chess player, easily of grandmaster strength
 Axel Tischer (born 1986), professional wrestler
 Toni Turek (1919–1984), football player
 Jan Ullrich (born 1973), cyclist
 Wolfgang Unzicker (1925–2006), chess grandmaster
 Nicole Uphoff (born 1967), equestrian
 Sebastian Vettel, Formula One driver (four-time World Champion)
 Berti Vogts, football player and manager
 Johannes Voigtmann (born 1992), basketball player
 Rudi Völler (born 1960), football player
 Sebastian Vollmer (born 1984), American football player, first German NFL draft pick; plays for the New England Patriots
 Katrin Wagner-Augustin (born 1977), sprint canoer
 Ralf Waldmann, motorcycle racer
 Fritz Walter (1920–2002), football player
 Fritz Walter (born 1960), football player
 Ulrich Wehling (born 1952), won the nordic combined event in the Winter Olympics three consecutive times, in 1972, 1976, and 1980
 Jens Weißflog (born 1964), ski jumper
 Tobias Wendl (born 1987), luger 
Moritz Wagner, NBA player for the Los Angeles Lakers
 Isabell Werth (born 1969), equestrian and world champion in dressage; holds the record for the most Olympic medals won by any equestrian athlete
 Kati Wilhelm (born 1976), biathlete
 Joachim Winkelhock, racing driver
 Manfred Winkelhock (1951–1985), racing driver; brother of Joachim Winkelhock
 Hans Günter Winkler (1926–2018), show jumping rider
 Katarina Witt (born 1965), figure skater
 Bärbel Wöckel (born 1955), sprinter
 Sigrun Wodars (born 1965), athlete
 Jenny Wolf (born 1979), speed skater
 Erik Zabel (born 1970), cyclist
 Christian Ziege (born 1972), football player and manager
 Johannes Zukertort (1842–1888), German Polish-Jewish chessmaster

Theologians, saints and beatified persons

 Heinrich Abeken (1809–1872), theologian
 Johannes Agricola (1494–1566), Protestant reformer
 Albertus Magnus, medieval philosopher and theologian
 Eusebius Amort (1692–1775)
 Pope Benedict XVI (also known as Joseph Ratzinger) (born 1927)
 Dietrich Bonhoeffer (1906–1945), theologian
 Johannes Bugenhagen (1485–1558), Protestant reformer of Pomerania and Denmark; theologian
 Rudolf Bultmann (1884–1976)
 Pope Clement II (1005–1047)
 Pope Damasus II (?–1048)
 Alfred Delp (1907–1945)
 Eugen Drewermann (born 1940)
 Johann Eck (1486–1543)
 Anne Catherine Emmerich (1774–1824)
 Matthias Faber (1586–1653)
 Pope Gregory V (c. 972–999)
 Adolf Harnack (1851–1930)
 Hedwig of Andech (1174–1243)
 Johann Gottfried Herder, poet, translator, philosopher and theologian
 Dietrich von Hildebrand (1889–1977)
 Clemens August Graf von Galen, beatified, cardinal
 Thomas à Kempis (c. 1380 – 1471), canon regular
 Adolph Kolping (1813–1865), beatified, priest
 Hans Küng (1928–2021)
 Karl Lehmann (1936–2018)
 Pope Leo IX (1002–1054)
 Martin Luther (1483–1546), Protestant Reformation
 Philipp Melanchthon (1497–1560), Protestant Reformation
 Moses Mendelssohn (1729–1786)
 Jürgen Moltmann (born 1926), theologian
 Bernhard Philberth (1927–2010), physicist, engineer, philosopher, theologian
 Karl Rahner (1904–1989), theologian
 Friedrich Schleiermacher (1768–1834), theologian, philosopher
 Albert Schweitzer (1875–1965), musician, physician, pastor, philosopher and theologian
 Dorothee Sölle (1929–2003)
 Edith Stein (1891–1942), saint, nun, victim of the Holocaust
 Johann Tetzel (1465–1519), monk
 Carsten Peter Thiede (1952–2004), theologian, New Testament historian, chaplain
 Helmut Thielicke (1908–1986), theologian
 Paul Tillich (1886–1965), theologian, philosopher
 Pope Victor II (c. 1018 – 1057)

Militants

 Sophie Scholl (1921–1943), member of the German resistance in World War II
Linda Wenzel, ISIS bride

Others

 Michael Baumgardt (born 1966), web designer
 Thomas Bach (born 1953), lawyer, former fencer
 Franz Borkenau (1900–1957), social scientist
 Gottfried Gabriel Bredow (1773–1814), historian
 Moritz Brosch (1829–1907), historian
 Dieter Claessens (1921–1997), sociologist
 Thomas Druyen (born 1957), sociologist
 Shlomo Eckstein (1929–2020), Israeli economist and president of Bar-Ilan University
 Gudrun Ensslin (1940–1977), terrorist
 Michael Fassbender (born 1977), actor  
 Siegfried Fischbacher (1939–2021), magician, conservationist
 Reinhard Furrer (1940–1995), astronaut
 Andreas Gaill (1526–1587), jurist
 Margarete Gütschow (1871–1951), archaeologist
 Herschel Grynszpan (1921–1944), Polish-Jewish refugee turned assassin
 Kerstin Günther (born 1967), business executive
 Johann Gutenberg (c. 1390s – 1468), printer
 Hildegard von Bingen (1098–1179), abbess, mystic
 Roy Horn (1944–2020), magician, conservationist
 Karen Horney, psychoanalyst
 Heribert Illig (born 1947), historian
 Peter Hoffmann, awarded outstanding historian
 Sigmund Jähn (1937–2019), first German in space
 Bruno Kahl (born 1962), intelligence administrative lawyer
 Erhart Kirfel, businessman, finance controller of the SPD
 René König (1906–1992), sociologist
 Siegfried Kracauer
 Christian Frederick Martin (1796–1867), inventor of the steel-string guitar
 Ulrike Meinhof (1934–1976), journalist and terrorist
 Ulf Merbold (born 1941), astronaut
 Carl von Ossietzky (1889–1938), journalist and pacifist
 Ferdinand Porsche (1875–1951), designer and founder of Porsche
 Ferry Porsche (1909–1998), automobile designer and son of Ferdinand Porsche
 Ferdinand Alexander Porsche (1935–2012), designer and member of the Porsche family
 Ferdinand Oliver Porsche (born 1961), lawyer, executive and family member of Porsche
 Ludwig Quidde (1858–1941), historian and pacifist
 Leopold von Ranke (1795–1886), historian
 Paul Reuter (1816–1899), entrepreneur, pioneer of telegraphy and news reporting
Dora Richter (1891–presumed 1933), first known woman to undergo sex reassignment surgery
 Margarete Rosenberg (1910–1985), lesbian Holocaust survivor
 Mathias Rust (born 1968), aviator who landed on Moscow's Red Square in 1987
 Helmut Schelsky (1912–1984), sociologist
 Oskar Schindler (1908–1974), industrialist; credited with saving the lives of 1,200 Jews during the Holocaust
 Hannelore Schmatz, mountaineer
 Heffa Schücking, environmentalist
 Albert Schweitzer (1875–1965), physician, humanitarian
 Henry Shultz (1776–1851), emigrant to the United States, entrepreneur
 Ell Smula (1914–1943), Ravensbrück concentration camp victim
 Guy Spier, author and investor
 Claus von Stauffenberg (1907–1944), Operation Valkyrie
 Ilse Totzke (1913–1987), Holocaust survivor
 Frederick Trump (1869–1918), businessman, patriarch of the Trump family
 Hans-Hasso von Veltheim (1885–1956) Indologist, Anthroposophist
 Ulrich Walter (born 1954), astronaut
 Alfred Weber, sociologist
 Max Weber, sociologist
 Diedrich Hermann Westermann (1875–1956), linguist
 Ruth Westheimer (born 1928), German-American sex therapist, talk show host, author, Doctor of Education, Holocaust survivor, and former Haganah sniper.
 William the Silent (1533–1584), German-born main leader of the Dutch revolt against the Spanish Habsburgs 
 Johann Joachim Winckelmann (1717–1768), art historian and archaeologist
 Karl Witte (1800–1883), jurist and scholar of Dante Alighieri
 Friedrich Heinrich Zinckgraf (1878–1954), gallery owner

More lists of Germans

 List of German astronauts
 List of German inventors and discoverers
 List of Alsatians and Lorrainians
 List of Baltic Germans
 List of German agriculture ministers
 List of German Jews
 List of German monarchs
 List of German popes
 List of Nobel laureates by country#Germany

See also

 Germans 
 German Diaspora 
 German Americans 
 German Brazilians 
 German Canadians 
 Germans in Bulgaria 
 Germans in the Czech Republic 
 Germans of Hungary 
 Germans in South Africa 
 Germans of Paraguay
 Germans of Poland
 Germans of Romania 
 German Argentines 
 German Russians
 German Venezuelan 
 List of Austrian Jews
 List of Austrians
 List of Swiss people
 Lists of people by nationality

References